Zone Stad was a popular Flemish-Belgian TV series about a police-department located in Antwerp. The show started in 2003 and ended in 2013. In the series, police officers solve various crimes, which are shown as realistically as possible. It is produced by the VMMa and broadcast on Belgian commercial channel vtm and TROS in the Netherlands.

Cast members

Main Cast

Recurring Cast

References

External links 
 

Flemish television shows
Belgian crime television series
Belgian drama television shows
2003 Belgian television series debuts
2013 Belgian television series endings
2000s Belgian television series
2010s Belgian television series
VTM (TV channel) original programming